Opshop is a New Zealand rock band who formed in 2002. They released their first album, You Are Here in 2004, their second album Second Hand Planet in 2007, and their third album Until The End of Time, which debuted at number one on the New Zealand Album Charts, in 2010.

In 2008, the band won the 2008 APRA Silver Scroll for Song of the Year for their song "One Day".

Jason Kerrison, the lead member of the group appeared on The Masked Singer NZ as a Tuatara, winning the first season. In 2011 (leading up to 2012), Jason Kerrison built a bunker after watching the 2009 film 2012. He said that John Cusack's performance was convincing, forcing him to think the end of the world was upon us.

Discography

Albums

Singles

References

External links
OPSHOP artist website

APRA Award winners
New Zealand alternative rock groups